Biomphalaria smithi is a species of air-breathing freshwater snail, an aquatic pulmonate gastropod mollusk in the family Planorbidae, the ram's horn snails.

Biomphalaria smithi is the type species of the genus Biomphalaria. The type material is stored in the Natural History Museum.

Distribution 
The type locality is the Lake Albert, Uganda.

Shell description 
The width of the shell is from 7.5 mm to 9.5. The height of the shell is 4 mm. The height of the aperture is 5 mm. The width of the aperture is 4.5 mm.

Phylogeny 
A cladogram showing phylogenic relations of species in the genus Biomphalaria:

References

Further reading 
 Baker F. C. (1945) The molluscan family Planorbidae. Urbana, The University of Illinois Press, page 89

External links 

Biomphalaria
Gastropods described in 1910